Wrestling World 1999 was a professional wrestling event produced by New Japan Pro-Wrestling (NJPW). It took place on January 4, 1999 in the Tokyo Dome. Wrestling World 1999 was the eighth January 4 Tokyo Dome Show held by NJPW. The show drew 52,500 spectators and $5,300,000 in ticket sales. The show featured 10 matches in total including four championship matches, three of which saw the championship change hands.

Production

Background
The January 4 Tokyo Dome Show is NJPW's biggest annual event and has been called "the largest professional wrestling show in the world outside of the United States" and the "Japanese equivalent to the Super Bowl".

Storylines
Wrestling World 1999 featured professional wrestling matches that involved different wrestlers from pre-existing scripted feuds and storylines. Wrestlers portrayed villains, heroes, or less distinguishable characters in scripted events that built tension and culminated in a wrestling match or series of matches.

Results

References

External links
NJPW.co.jp 

1999 in professional wrestling
1999 in Tokyo
January 1999 events in Asia
1999